The Terrornauts is a 1967 British science fiction film produced by Amicus Productions. The film is based on The Wailing Asteroid by Murray Leinster, adapted for screen by John Brunner.

Synopsis

Project Star Talk is based at a UK radio telescope site; its mission is to listen for radio signals from other intelligences. Dr Joe Burke (Simon Oates) is the head of the project, assisted by his small team, consisting of electronics expert Ben Keller (Stanley Meadows) and office manager Sandy Lund (Zena Marshall). Due to the lack of success reported by the site manager, Dr Henry Shore (Max Adrian), Project Star Talk is given ninety days to report positive results. While waiting for a response, Dr Burke tells of his father's discovery at an archaeological dig in France of a cube that gave him strange dreams as a boy, inspiring him to become an astronomer. During this period, an accountant, Mr Yellowlees (Charles Hawtrey) is sent to look over the project's accounts. As luck would have it, a repeating signal is received by the project, but the signal is only coming from a small asteroid with no atmosphere in the outer solar system. Despite this, Dr. Burke spends the balance of his grant to equip the telescope with a powerful transmitter to contact the source of the signals. The night of the transmission, Mr Yellowlees and Mrs Jones (Patricia Hayes), who runs the tea trolley, stay to witness this historic event. The signal is sent and reaches the asteroid. The asteroid has on it a huge installation that receives the radio signal and answers it with a spaceship sent riding down the radio beam to the point of transmission. When the spacecraft arrives at Project Star Talk, it picks up the transmitter shed and carries it, the project staff and the two witnesses to the alien installation. The telescope staff's leader believes, despite eyewitnesses, that the transmitter shed exploded, killing the Star Talk team.

Upon arrival at the asteroid, the team is greeted by a robot that takes them through a series of tests. After each test, they are provided with rewards such as food for the intelligence test, a weapon for the motivation test, and a "Knowledge Cube" for the knowledge test. After a tour of a control room, they are then brought to a chamber with a small platform and a figure in a chair, who simply happens to be the long-dead caretaker of the base. As they head back to the control room, Ben bumps Sandy onto the platform and she is "transposed" in a puff of smoke to a distant planet peopled by savages who try to kill her. Dr Burke then follows Sandy to the planet armed with the gun, effects a rescue before she can be killed, and discovers the secret of the Knowledge Cubes in the process. Dr Burke plugs into the cube, and the horrible secret is revealed: the planet of savages is the home of the survivors of an interstellar war that is fast approaching Earth, and the Star Talk team are the only ones who can use the advanced weapons of the installation to stop an invading enemy fleet from destroying planet Earth. The team searches frantically through the huge library of cubes for the instructions to use the weapons of the fortress, but are unsuccessful. As the enemy fleet comes into range, the robot delivers the cubes needed just in time. The battle is joined, but the Star Talk team has a hard time hitting the aliens with missiles, so, with the cubes' instruction, the fortress' engines are started and they rise off the asteroid to intercept the aliens who, nearing defeat, then crash into the fortress. Dr Burke sets the "transposer plates" for Earth and the Star Talk team, Mr Yellowlees, and Mrs Jones are transposed to the very archaeological dig in France where Dr Burke's father found the cube so long ago. While they congratulate themselves on their luck, a gendarme (André Maranne) arrests them for trespassing.

Cast
 Simon Oates ...  Dr. Joe Burke 
 Zena Marshall ...  Sandy Lund 
 Charles Hawtrey ...  Joshua Yellowlees 
 Patricia Hayes ...  Mrs. Jones 
 Stanley Meadows ...  Ben Keller 
 Max Adrian ...  Dr. Henry Shore 
 Frank Barry ...  Burke as a child 
 Richard Carpenter ...  Danny 
 Leonard Cracknell ...  Nick 
 André Maranne ...  Gendarme 
 Frank Forsyth ...  Uncle 
 Robert Jewell ...  Robot Operator

Critical reception

The Terrornauts was distributed as a double feature with They Came from Beyond Space. This double bill has been called "the two worst films the company ever produced".

References

External links

http://www.planet-9.de/luke/screenshots/terrornauts

1960s science fiction films
1967 films
Films directed by Montgomery Tully
Films based on American novels
Films scored by Elisabeth Lutyens
British science fiction films
Fiction about asteroids
Amicus Productions films
Embassy Pictures films
Films based on science fiction novels
1960s English-language films
1960s British films